Al-Shamiyah al-Kubra Madrasa or al-Mu'azzamiyya Madrasa is a 12th-century madrasah complex located in Damascus, Syria.

See also
 Al-Adiliyah Madrasa
 Al-Rukniyah Madrasa
 Az-Zahiriyah Library
 Nur al-Din Madrasa

References

Buildings and structures completed in 1190
Mausoleums in Syria
Ayyubid architecture in Syria
Madrasas in Damascus
1190 establishments
12th-century establishments in the Ayyubid Sultanate